The Finals, formerly known as World Group, is the highest level of Davis Cup competition in 2022. It took place from 13 to 18 September and from 22 to 27 November 2022. The ties were contested in a best-of-three rubbers format and played on one day. There were two singles followed by a doubles. The Russian Tennis Federation were the defending champions, but they were banned from competing in international events following the 2022 Russian invasion of Ukraine. Canada won the title, defeating Australia in the final. It was Canada's first ever Davis Cup title. On 13 March 2022, ITF announced that Serbia, which had been awarded a wild card for the 2022 Finals, had replaced the Russian Tennis Federation as the highest-ranked losing semi-finalist in the 2021 Finals. On 17 March 2022, ITF announced that Canada will compete in the Finals as the replacement wild card.

Participating teams
16 nations took part in the Finals. The qualification was as follows:
1 finalist from the previous edition (Croatia, defending champion Russia was suspended)
1 highest-ranked losing semi-finalist from the previous edition (announced by ITF on 13 March 2022 as Serbia to replace Russia)
2 wild card teams (Canada and Great Britain)
12 winners of the Qualifying Round, in March 2022

Overview

 (WC)
 (2021F)

 (WC)

 (2021SF)

 (host)

 Notes
TH = Title holder
WC = Wild card
2021F = Finalist from the 2021 tournament
2021SF = Highest-ranked losing semi-finalist from the 2021 tournament

Seeds
The seedings were based on the Davis Cup Ranking of 7 March 2022. Croatia, as runners-up in 2021, were seeded No. 1, with Spain, France and USA also seeded based on the latest Davis Cup Nations Ranking. The remaining 12 nations were distributed in Pots 2-4 according to the latest Davis Cup Nations Ranking. Four host nations, Germany, Great Britain, Italy and Spain were placed in different groups.

Team nominations
SR = Singles ranking, DR = Doubles ranking.

Group stage
Rankings are as of 12 September 2022.

Group A

Group B

Group C

Group D

Knockout stage
Rankings are as of 21 November 2022.

Format
The 16 teams were divided in four round robin groups of four teams each. The top two teams in each group qualified for the quarterfinals.

Group stage

Overview
G = Group, T = Ties, M = Matches, S = Sets, H = Hosts

Group A

Argentina vs. Sweden

Italy vs. Croatia

Croatia vs. Sweden

Italy vs. Argentina

Argentina vs. Croatia

Italy vs. Sweden

Group B

South Korea vs. Canada

Spain vs. Serbia

South Korea vs. Serbia

Spain vs. Canada

Serbia vs. Canada

Note: Kecmanović/Krajinović's retirement victory over Galarneau/Pospisil counted as a 6–1, 6–0 win.

Spain vs. South Korea

Group C

Belgium vs. Australia

France vs. Germany

France vs. Australia

Germany vs. Belgium

France vs. Belgium

Germany vs. Australia

Group D

Kazakhstan vs. Netherlands

United States vs. Great Britain

United States vs. Kazakhstan

Great Britain vs. Netherlands

United States vs. Netherlands

Great Britain vs. Kazakhstan

Knockout stage

Bracket

Quarterfinals

Italy vs. United States

Germany vs. Canada

Netherlands vs. Australia

Spain vs. Croatia

Semifinals

Italy vs. Canada

Australia vs. Croatia

Final

Canada vs. Australia

References

External links
Official website

Finals
Davis Cup Finals
Davis Cup
Davis Cup